HNLMS Hydrograaf (H8021) is a expeditionary survey boat (ESB) of the Royal Netherlands Navy.

History 
The Hydrograaf fills the gap between the s and the rigid-hulled inflatable boats (RHIBs) or sloops which are launched from the larger ships from the Dutch Navy. The RHIBs and sloops became to small or old to be used effectively and sail further from the mother ship.

In 2016 DMO wrote a European invitation to tender for the construction of one ESB. In March 2019 a contract was signed with Damen Den Helder and construction started later that year. The Hydrograaf was launched on 21 January 2021 and commissioned on 26 February 2021 via video call by then State Secretary for Defence Barbara Visser.

References 

Survey ships
Survey vessels of the Royal Netherlands Navy